Chella Man (born November 26, 1998) is an Asian American actor, model, artist, YouTuber, and LGBTQ activist. He is known for sharing his experiences as a transgender, deaf, genderqueer, Asian, and Jewish person of color. Man rose to wider prominence in 2019  for portraying mute superhero Jericho in the second season of the DC Universe series Titans.

Early life and education
Chella Man was born November 26, 1998, and is of Jewish and Chinese descent. He was raised in a small town in a conservative Central Pennsylvania community, where he "did not consider [himself] beautiful".  He was assigned female at birth and experienced gender dysphoria during childhood.

Man began to lose his hearing at four years old. By age 13, he was profoundly deaf, and the next year he received his first cochlear implant. At 16 he had a second implant placed in his other ear.

In 2017, after experiencing gender dysphoria throughout his childhood, Man began transitioning using testosterone. His use of masculinizing hormone therapy, along with top surgery, helped with his identity, self-esteem, and body image.

 Man is a student at The New School in Manhattan where he studies virtual reality programming.

Career 
In March 2017, he created his YouTube channel where he posted videos about his personal experiences with gender dysphoria, his identity, his love life, and American Sign Language translation videos to popular songs. Man stated in an interview with Teen Vogue, "There is an extreme lack of representation for young, Deaf, queer, Jewish, Asian, transgender artists...So, I decided to be my own representation." Man also posts videos that attempt to mobilize young voters and discuss the political effects of the Trump administration, whom he did not support. Man began doing so after president Donald Trump visited his high school during his presidential campaign.

In May 2018, Man presented his TedX Talk entitled Becoming Him in which he talks about his transition journey and gender issues for LGBTQ youth and people with disabilities.

Man signed to IMG as their first Deaf Jewish-Asian model in September 2018. He has modeled for magazines including The Advocate, Bad Hombre, Time Out, Dazed, Gay Times and Mission, and for brands including Calvin Klein, Gap, and American Eagle.

In March 2019, it was announced that Man would make his acting debut as Jericho, a mute crime fighter, for the DC Universe's digital series Titans in its second season. Man stated that he connected to the character, who uses sign language to communicate. He discusses the importance of disabled actors playing disabled characters to support proper representation, stating, "Casting disabled actors/actresses for disabled roles will aid to authentically represent and deconstruct stereotypes built around our identities". Man has discussed and worked alongside fellow disabilities activist Judith Heumann, and queer activist Jillian Mercado.

In March 2021, Man appeared on Tamron Hall, discussing his transition that went viral in 2017.

In June 2021, Man is a recently published author to Penguin Random House; his book, Continuum was the newest addition to the Pocket Change Collective, a series focused on creating a space to discuss gender, sexuality, activism and intersectionality within the literary world.

In October 2021, Man became one of the first out trans men to work with a major beauty brand, as a member of the team of young influencers Yves Saint Laurent assembled to promote their Nu Collection, aimed at a Gen Z audience.

Art 
Man paints, designs tattoos, and has interest in fashion design. Man described how he finds inspiration as "pulled from anything I stumble upon that I find aesthetically pleasing. This could be a Picasso in the MoMA or a polka-dotted hat on the NY subway."

Featured on his YouTube channel, Man's art publication is a 3-minute long visual performance, The Beauty of Being Deaf, promoting a jewelry collection that transforms hearing aids into ear jewelry. Man stated he created this jewelry collection as a way to introduce Deaf people into the fashion industry, as well as removing the stigma for wearing hearing aids and cochlear implants. He states, "Yet the appearance of hearing aids and cochlear implants have always created a disconnect. The pieces never felt like me, and I had no control over their designs. I always found myself brainstorming ways to reclaim the machinery that had become a part of me."

Personal life 
Man communicates in English and American Sign Language and most closely identifies with the bicultural identity for deaf people.

He was previously in a relationship with MaryV Benoit, an artist and photographer.

Honors and awards
 Out100, GLAAD (2018)
 Dazed 100, number 10, Dazed (2019)
 Pride50, Queerty (2019)
 Pride 25, Pride.com (2019)
 LGBTQ+ account, Shorty Awards (2019)
 Judge, Shorty Awards (2020)
 Hero Award, Attitude (2021)

Filmography

See also 
 Chinese people in New York City
 LGBT culture in New York City
 List of LGBT people from New York City

References

External links 
 
 
 Chella Man on YouTube
 
 

1998 births
Living people
21st-century American actors
American non-binary actors
American transgender actors
Transgender Jews
Transgender men
LGBT people from Pennsylvania
Jewish American actors
Deaf artists
American deaf actors
People with non-binary gender identities
American actors of Chinese descent
American LGBT people of Asian descent
YouTube channels launched in 2017
LGBT YouTubers
Actors from Pennsylvania
American LGBT rights activists
20th-century American LGBT people
21st-century American LGBT people
Non-binary artists
Non-binary models
Non-binary activists
21st-century American Jews